The House of Nassau-Weilburg, a branch of the House of Nassau, ruled a division of the County of Nassau, which was a state in what is now Germany, then part of the Holy Roman Empire, from 1344 to 1806.

On 17 July 1806, upon the dissolution of the Holy Roman Empire, the principalities of Nassau-Usingen and Nassau-Weilburg both joined the Confederation of the Rhine. Under pressure from Napoleon, both principalities merged to become the Duchy of Nassau on 30 August 1806, under the joint rule of Prince Frederick August of Nassau-Usingen and his younger cousin, Prince Frederick William of Nassau-Weilburg. As Frederick August had no heirs, he agreed that Frederick William should become the sole ruler after his death. However, Frederick William died from a fall on the stairs at Schloss Weilburg on 9 January 1816 and it was his son William who later became duke of a unified Nassau.

The sovereigns of this house afterwards governed the Duchy of Nassau until 1866. Since 1890, they have reigned over the Grand Duchy of Luxembourg.

Religion
The first two Grand Dukes of Luxembourg, Adolphe and Guillaume IV, were Protestants, however, the Christian denomination of the house changed after Grand Duke Guillaume IV's marriage to Marie Anne de Braganza, who was Roman Catholic.

Gallery

Sovereigns from the House of Nassau-Weilburg

Nassau

Counts of Nassau-Weilburg
 1344–71: John I
 1371–1429: Philip I
 1429–42: Philip II and John II
 1442–92: Philip II
 1492–1523: Louis I
 1523–59: Philip III
 1559–93: Albrecht
 1559–1602: Philip IV
 1593–1625: Louis II
 1625–29: William Louis, John IV and Ernst Casimir
 1629–55: Ernst Casimir
 1655–75: Frederick
 1675–88: John Ernst

Princely counts of Nassau-Weilburg
 1688–1719: John Ernst
 1719–53: Charles August
 1753–88: Charles Christian
 1788–1816: Frederick William
 1816: William

Dukes of Nassau
 1816–39: William
 1839–66: Adolphe

Grand Dukes of Luxembourg

 1890–1905: Adolphe
 1905–12: William IV
 1912–19: Marie-Adélaïde
 1919–64: Charlotte
 1964–2000: Jean
 2000–present: Henri

<div style="overflow:auto">

Family Tree

References

|-

 
German noble families
Luxembourgian noble families
Counties of the Holy Roman Empire
1340s establishments in the Holy Roman Empire
1344 establishments in Europe